Perugia (subtitled Recorded Live at the Montrex Jazz Festival) is a live album by pianist Roland Hanna featuring a solo performance recorded at the 1974 Montreux Jazz Festival in Switzerland and released by the Freedom label.

Reception

AllMusic reviewer Ron Wynn stated: "Excellent piano solos -- some of Hanna's sharpest".

Track listing
All compositions by Roland Hanna, except where indicated.
 "Take the "A" Train" (Billy Strayhorn) – 6:14
 "I Got It Bad (and That Ain't Good)" (Duke Ellington, Paul Francis Webster) – 7:31
 "Time Dust Gathered" – 6:22
 "Perugia" – 8:12
 "A Child Is Born" (Thad Jones) – 5:40
 "Wistful Moment" – 7:13

Personnel 
Roland Hanna – piano

References 

1975 albums
Freedom Records albums
Roland Hanna albums
Albums recorded at the Montreux Jazz Festival
Solo piano jazz albums